Petropavlivka may refer to the following places in Ukraine:

 Petropavlivka, Dnipropetrovsk Oblast
 Petropavlivka, Kupiansk Raion, Kharkiv Oblast
 Petropavlivka, Luhansk Oblast
 Petropavlivka, Beryslav Raion, Kherson Oblast
 Petropavlivka Raion

See also
 Petropavlovka (disambiguation)